The Nebraska Zephyr was a streamlined passenger train operated by the Chicago, Burlington and Quincy Railroad (CB&Q, commonly known by the shorter name of "Burlington") between Chicago, Illinois; Omaha, Nebraska; and Lincoln, Nebraska, from 1947 to 1971. Until 1968, the service was provided by two Twin Cities Zephyr articulated trainsets — the "Train of the Gods" and "Train of the Goddesses" — that became synonymous with it. The Nebraska Zephyr was one of many trains discontinued when Amtrak began operations in 1971. The "Train of the Goddesses" set is preserved at the Illinois Railway Museum in Union, Illinois.

History 

The Burlington introduced the Nebraska Zephyr on the Chicago–Omaha–Lincoln route on November 16, 1947, replacing the Ak-Sar-Ben Zephyr. The Zephyr joined four other trains on the route: the Exposition Flyer, Denver Zephyr, Ak-Sar-Ben, and Fast Mail. On-board services included a parlor car, dining car, and cocktail lounge. The trains operated on a daylight schedule between Chicago and Lincoln. Westbound #11 departed Chicago at 12:45 PM and arrived in Lincoln at 10:30 PM. Eastbound #12 departed Lincoln at 11:00 AM and arrived in Chicago at 8:45 PM.

Although the Burlington removed the distinctive "Zephyr" trainsets in February 1968, the train continued to operate as the Nebraska Zephyr, albeit with reduced service. A June 1968 timetable advertised a "dinette coach" as the only amenity, and the running time had lengthened to 11 hours 30 minutes. The Nebraska Zephyr lost its name prior to its discontinuance on April 30, 1971.

Equipment 

The twin Nebraska Zephyr trainsets were built in 1936 by the Budd Company as the second pair of Twin Zephyrs, built for service between Chicago and Minneapolis-St. Paul, both of which had cars named for classical deities. One trainset was known as the "Train of the Goddesses" and its cars were named Venus, Vesta, Minerva, Psyche, Ceres, Diana, and  Juno. The other trainset was known as the "Train of the Gods" and its cars were named Apollo, Mars, Neptune, Cupid, Vulcan, Mercury, and Jupiter. Each consist included the following cars: cocktail lounge, two 60-seat coaches, a coach-dinette, dining car, a parlor car, and a parlor-observation car. Early typical motive power for these trains was provided by a pair of shovel-nose diesels named Pegasus (CB&Q #9904) and Zephyrus (CB&Q 9905).

In their original configuration the two parlor cars, Diana and Mercury, had 19 seats and a private drawing room. In 1942, prior to the sets entering service as the Nebraska Zephyr, 42 standard seats replaced the parlor seats. The Burlington added two new baggage cars, the Argo and Olympus, to the trains in February 1948. Finally, cost-cutting in the 1960s led to several changes in the food service arrangements on the trains. In 1963 the Burlington removed the cocktail lounges from the Venus and Apollo, replacing them with 42 coach seats. In 1966 the dining cars Ceres and Vulcan were rebuilt as "cafeteria cars" featuring vending machines.

The Burlington withdrew the sets from service in February 1968, though the Nebraska Zephyr continued to operate. The "Train of the Goddesses" arrived at the Illinois Railway Museum on September 21, 1968 and it has been in use by the museum since then; it is still operated on short runs on the Museum's substantial trackage, providing train enthusiasts and tourists with an experience reminiscent of the heyday of the Burlington's Zephyr service. 
In 1977 the "Train of the Gods" was refurbished, sold by the Burlington, and delivered to Saudi Arabia for use on the Dammam–Riyadh line of the Saudi Railways Organization,  where it operated into the 21st Century.

Gallery

References

External links 

 
 Condensed 1961 Burlington timetable

Named passenger trains of the United States
Passenger rail transportation in Illinois
Passenger rail transportation in Iowa
Passenger rail transportation in Nebraska
Passenger trains of the Chicago, Burlington and Quincy Railroad
North American streamliner trains
Articulated passenger trains
Railway services introduced in 1947
Railway services discontinued in 1971